Chettisham railway station is a former railway station in Chettisham, Cambridgeshire. It was on the Great Eastern Railway route between Ely and March. Although the station closed for passengers in 1960, the line is still in use.

History
The ECR was amalgamated with other railways in 1862 to form the Great Eastern Railway. The station was originally named Chittisham; it was renamed Chettisham on 1 August 1901.

The station closed to passengers on 13 June 1960 but was briefly reopened with temporary platforms as "Ely Temporary Station" in 1991–2 while Ely Station was being renovated in connection with the electrification of the main line from Cambridge to King's Lynn

References

External links
Chettisham Station on navigable O.S. map

Disused railway stations in Cambridgeshire
Former Great Eastern Railway stations
Railway stations in Great Britain opened in 1847
Railway stations in Great Britain closed in 1960
1847 establishments in England